First Shot may refer to:

 First shot or "shot heard round the world", the beginning of the American Revolutionary War in the battles of Lexington and Concord
 First Shot (album), a 2009 album by Some & Any
 First Shot (1993 film), a Hong Kong film directed by David Lam
 First Shot (2002 film), an American television film starring Mariel Hemingway